The Ford Pampa is a coupe utility manufactured by Ford do Brasil between 1982 and 1997. It was derived from the Ford Corcel and Ford Del Rey, and was the best-selling coupe utility in Brazil for several years.

The Ford Pampa was replaced by the Fiesta-based Ford Courier in the small pickup market of South America.

The launch
In 1982, Ford do Brasil launched the pickup based on the Ford Corcel II. It was the second such vehicle in the segment, then after the Fiat Fiorino (known at the time as the City), pickup derived from the Fiat 147. The name Pampa alludes to a horse that has the body all threshed. The Pampa had the comfort of a car in the cabin, but the robustness of a utility vehicle with a more superior load capacity than its smaller competitor. It had the front of a Corcel II and a loading bay inspired by the much larger US-style F-100 pickup of the time. The difference between the Fiat pickup and the Ford is that the former used the same independent back suspension of Fiat 147, whereas the Ford had a rigid rear axle and adopted semielliptical springs in place of coil springs, more suitable for carrying heavy loads. Due to its success, other brands soon followed suit in launching their own derivatives, Volkswagen with the Saveiro (appearing in the same year, it was derived from the Volkswagen Gol hatchback) and Chevrolet with Chevy 500 (derived from the Chevette) in 1983.

Technical specifications
Using the same 1.6-liter engine and a four- or five-speed manual gearbox from the Corcel, came with the differential of Corcel 1:4 to better use to advantage the force of the engine. It also had the front suspension of the Corcel, with stiffer springs and shock absorbers to support bigger loads. With regard to the Corcel, the wheelbase was also increased. The fuel tank in the Pampa was soon moved to behind the cabin, and its doors were made smaller - identical to the ones of the four-door Ford Del Rey. The Pampa pickup had very good general performance. The Pampa’s options included a digital clock, air conditioning, adjustable head restraints, radio, and inertia reel seat belts. Many of these items were found in the luxurious Del Rey.

1984-model revisions
Revisions for the 1984 model year included the Pampa receiving the CHT engine which was more powerful and economical. Also for the 1984 model year, a 4x4 version was launched, which would be only Brazilian pickup derived from a two-wheel drive car to be offered with four-wheel drive. Externally, the 4x4 Pampa had few differences compared with the 4x2 version; the 4x4 had squared-off grating in the grille, off-road tires, free-wheeling wheel hubs, and over-riders on the bumpers.

1986-model revisions
In 1986, L and GL models were introduced and Pampa models received the front from the 4x4 version. For the 1987 model year, the Pampa got the new front from the Del the Rey and the Ghia version was added to the range with the luxury equipment of the Del Rey Ghia, including electric windows. However, air conditioning was only an optional extra. For the Pampa in 1989, the larger VW AP-1800 engine became available for the L, GL, and Ghia versions, although the 1.6-liter CHT engine remained in the L and GL 4x4 versions. For 1991, the S version arrived, with the same 1.8-liter motor as the Gol GTS and Escort XR3. Standard equipment included side rubbing strakes, a dipping rear view mirror, optional hydraulic power-assisted steering, alloy wheels, front spoiler with integral fog lights and items which were standard on the Ghia version.

1992-model revisions and final production

In 1992, the Pampa received another new front, identical to the Del Rey, which had been discontinued in 1991. In 1994, it received an electronically controlled carburettor (2E CE) in the 1.8-liter versions, following the alterations to the VW AP-1800 unit. In 1995, the Ghia and 1.6 L GL 4x4 were discontinued, leaving the 1.6- and 1.8-liter L, 1.8-liter GL, and 1.8-liter S. For the 1997 model year, the 1.8-liter engines were equipped with single-point electronic fuel injection. By the end of production in 1997, in excess of 350,000 units had been sold. Its replacement, the Ford Courier, never achieved the same sales success.

References

Pampa
Coupé utilities
Vehicles introduced in 1982
1990s cars
Cars of Brazil